Eric Wendell Shaw (born September 17, 1971) is a former American football linebacker who played three seasons with the Cincinnati Bengals of the National Football League (NFL).

Shaw attended Pensacola High School in Pensacola, Florida. He first enrolled at Florida State University before transferring to Louisiana Tech University. He was drafted by the Bengals in the twelfth round of the 1992 NFL Draft. With the Bengals from 1992 through 1994, Shaw appeared in 28 games (10 starts).

A comeback attempt in 1999 with the Shreveport Knights of the short-lived Regional Football League ended after one game due to a neck injury.

References

External links
Just Sports Stats

Living people
1971 births
Players of American football from Pensacola, Florida
American football linebackers
African-American players of American football
Florida State Seminoles football players
Louisiana Tech Bulldogs football players
Cincinnati Bengals players
Regional Football League players
21st-century African-American sportspeople
20th-century African-American sportspeople